is the second single by Japanese rock singer Nana Kitade. The title track was used as the closing theme song to TV Tokyo's Japan Countdown for the month of January 2004. The first press edition of the single came with a mini pin-up poster. The single reached #55 on the Oricon charts and stayed on the charts for a total of three weeks. This single has sold a total of 5,249 copies.

Music video
The music video for "Utareru Ame" shows Kitade recording the song in a dark studio by herself. The video is interspersed with images of rain on glass, flowers, and electronic meters.

Track list
  - 4:00
  - 4:01
  - 6:15
 Utareru Ame: Raw "Break" Track - 3:38

Charts

2004 singles
Nana Kitade songs
Songs written by Nana Kitade
2004 songs
SME Records singles